Rosemarie Ashley Falk  is a Canadian politician from Saskatchewan, who has represented the riding of Battlefords—Lloydminster in the House of Commons of Canada since a by-election victory in 2017. She is a member of the Conservative Party of Canada caucus. Falk currently serves as the Deputy Shadow Minister for Families, Children and Social Development and Status of Women.

Personal life 
Rosemarie Falk was born and raised in Lloydminster, Saskatchewan. Falk holds a Bachelor of Social Work from the University of Calgary. Prior to her election, Falk worked in Saskatchewan as a registered Social Worker, and has experience as a legal assistant and as a legislative assistant in federal politics. Rosemarie Falk is a mother of three. At the time of her 2017 election, her occupation was listed as stay at home parent.

Political career 
In the 2017 federal by-election, Rosemarie Falk ran as the Conservative candidate for Battlefords—Lloydminster, following the resignation of long-standing Conservative MP Gerry Ritz. Falk won the House of Commons seat with 8,952 votes of 12,876 votes cast, earning nearly 70% of the vote share. Falk defeated New Democratic Party candidate Matt Fedler, the Liberal Party's Larry Ingram, the Green Party's Yvonne Potter-Pihach and independent Ken Finlayson. Falk's 2017 campaign intended to present voters with the "positive Conservative vision" and advocated for affordability, consistent with Andrew Scheer's cost of living platform.

Rosemarie Falk was re-elected in the 2019 Canadian Federal election on October 21. Falk earned 79 percent of the vote with a total of 27,784 votes. Her closing statements from the Federal candidates Chamber forum were "together we can help elect a new Conservative government that will live within its means while putting more money in your pocket. On Oct. 21st it is time for you to get ahead." Following her re-election, Falk released a statement that she was ready to return to Ottawa "focused on being a strong voice for Canadian taxpayers, families and rural communities like ours."

Falk was a member of the Human Resources, Skills and Social Development and the Status of Persons with Disabilities Parliament Session 42-1 from January 29, 2018 to September 11, 2019. Prior to her election to Parliament, Falk worked as an assistant to Conservative MP Arnold Viersen.

Political Views 
In her House of Commons Maiden Speech, Falk stated that she is proud to promote such Canadian values as "freedom of conscience, freedom of thought, and freedom of belief." Additionally, in this address, Falk called on the Canadian government for the removal of the "Liberal values test" from Canadian summer job applications. Falk supports the development of pipelines, as well as the Conservative three-point platform for environmental action. Falk also believes in a "compassionate, fair, and orderly legal immigration system."

Controversy 
Falk faced controversy for high-fiving Conservative MP Dane Lloyd after voting against Bill C-262 on May 30, 2018. Following social media backlash and public condemnation from First Nations National Chief Perry Bellegarde, Falk released a statement claiming that the high-five was unrelated to that particular vote. Bill C-262 was focused on aligning Canadian laws with the United Nations Declaration on the Rights of Indigenous Peoples

Electoral record

References

External links 
 
 Profile at House of Commons
 Profile at Parliament of Canada

Living people
Conservative Party of Canada MPs
Members of the House of Commons of Canada from Saskatchewan
21st-century Canadian politicians
Women members of the House of Commons of Canada
Women in Saskatchewan politics
People from Lloydminster
University of Calgary alumni
1988 births
21st-century Canadian women politicians